Sidney Sammual Montgomery (born May 25, 1990) is a former American football defensive end. He previously played in the Canadian Football League (CFL) and before that the National Football League (NFL), into which he was drafted by the Houston Texans in the third round of the 2013 NFL Draft. He played college football at Louisiana State University, where he earned All-American recognition.

Early years
Montgomery was born in Greenwood, South Carolina. He attended Greenwood High School, and played for the Greenwood Eagles high school football team.

Montgomery also ran track and field in addition to football. He was a member of the high school relay team. He ran a personal best time of 11.34 seconds in the 100 meters at the 2009 Regional 1 Class AAAA. He also competed in the shot put, he finished 4th with a throw of 14.20 meters.

Considered a four-star recruit by 247Sports.com, Montgomery was listed as the No. 3 weak-side defensive end in the nation in 2009.

College career
While attending Louisiana State University, Montgomery played for coach Les Miles's LSU Tigers football team from 2010 to 2012. Following his sophomore season in 2011, he was named an All-American by the Football Writers Association of America, Pro Football Weekly, and Scout.com. He was also a first-team All-Southeastern Conference (SEC) selection in 2011 and 2012.

Professional career

2013 NFL Draft

Montgomery was drafted to the Houston Texans in the third round, with the 95th overall pick, of the 2013 NFL Draft.

Houston Texans
The Texans released Montgomery, along with two other players, on October 21 for unspecified violations of team rules prior to a road game against the Kansas City Chiefs.

Oakland Raiders
He was signed by the Oakland Raiders on December 18, 2013. He was released on December 21, 2013.

Cincinnati Bengals
Montgomery signed with the Cincinnati Bengals on April 11, 2014. On August 31, 2014, he was signed to the Bengals' practice squad.

On January 23, 2015, Montgomery signed a reserve/future contract with the Bengals. On August 31, 2015, he was released by the Bengals.

Post-NFL career
After being released by the Bengals, Montgomery spent time on the rosters of both the Edmonton Eskimos and Winnipeg Blue Bombers of the Canadian Football League (CFL) but did not participate in any regular season CFL games. In June 2018, Montgomery signed with the Massachusetts Pirates of the National Arena League (NAL), and made his regular season debut with the Pirates on July 7 of that same year.

In 2019, Montgomery joined the Memphis Express in the Alliance of American Football. He was placed on injured reserve on March 4, 2019. The league ceased operations in April 2019.

Montgomery later moved to the XFL, where he was selected by the DC Defenders in the seventh round of the 2020 XFL Draft. He had his contract terminated when the league suspended operations on April 10, 2020.

References

External links
Oakland Raiders bio
LSU Tigers bio

1990 births
Living people
American expatriates in Canada
American football defensive ends
Cincinnati Bengals players
DC Defenders players
Edmonton Elks players
Houston Texans players
LSU Tigers football players
Memphis Express (American football) players
Oakland Raiders players
People from Greenwood, South Carolina
Players of American football from South Carolina